Antônio Wilson Vieira Honório (11 June 1943 – 11 March 2019), nicknamed Coutinho, was a Brazilian coach and footballer who played as a forward for Santos Futebol Clube, where he was a teammate and one of the best partners of Pelé, and became a member of the Brazil national team that won the 1962 FIFA World Cup. He is considered one of the greatest strikers in the history of Brazilian football with 368 goals in 457 matches even though he prematurely ended his football career before the age of 30 due to knee problems. His main virtues as a striker were coldness and precision in finishing, the ability to dribble in tight spaces and a keen awareness of team play, which allowed him to make several one-two passes with Pelé in the midst of opponent defenses. In Brazil, during his time as a player, he received the nickname "genius of the small area" many years before other great Brazilian striker Romario. Pelé himself declares that "Coutinho, within the area, was better than me. His coldness was something supernatural".

Early years
Born in Piracicaba, State of São Paulo in 1943 he was son of Antônia and Waldemar Honório. His start in football occurred in an unusual way, after fleeing his home in Piracibaba, in the countryside of São Paulo, to pursue his dream to become a professional football player. Coutinho was spotted at the age of 13 by Santos' coach Luís Alonso Pérez ("Lula") in a preliminary match of XV de Piracicaba against Santos in his hometown. After being praised by Santos FC players during that match he decided travel to Santos and try his chances in becoming a professional football player for Santos. He borrowed some money and a suitcase and left Piracicaba directly to Santos, 231 km from his hometown. The day after his arrival in Santos, his father arrived desperately in Santos from Piracicaba and went to pick him up to go home. His father (Mr Waldemar Honório) didn't want to hear about it and left with his son directly to the bus station. They embarked back home, but the Santos FC board of directors placed an emissary following the bus by car. And, at the first stop, they convinced Coutinho's father that football was a good investment in the future. And that was how Coutinho returned to Santos, starting his career in professional football. One year later he became part of the Santos' lower division. At the age of 13 years and 11 months, Coutinho debuted as a professional player, a record never broken for any other players.

Club career
Coutinho debuted on Santos' professional team on May 17, 1958, still at the age of 14, in a match in Goiânia, against Sírio Libanês Futebol Clube. Coincidentally, the score was the same as the debut of his legendary partner Pelé, which had happened almost two years before: a 7–1 victory for Santos. And, like Pelé, Coutinho also scored one of Peixe's goals in his first match for the club's adult squad.

In a game at the Olympic Stadium, journalists and people at the stadium reported seeing one of the  most beautiful goals in the history of football. Pelé received the ball in the midfield on his head and quickly passed it to Coutinho, who also with his head, gave it back to Pelé. And after a few more head-only passes the attacking players approached the opponent's box, without the ball touching the pitch. In the final moment, with only the goalkeeper in front of him, Coutinho could have finished the amazing combination himself with a goal, but he saw Lima coming from behind and adjusted to pass, once again with his head, and allowed Lima to score.
This goal left the opponents Grêmio fans standing up, applauding a majestic goal combination between two maestros of the ball.

Coutinho, in addition to resembling Pelé with his style of playing, also had physical characteristics similar to Pele. Therefore, a legend arose that the player started to wear a white ribbon on one of the arms, to help distinguish them. Regarding this urban legend, Coutinho said this: "For a short while, when I made a beautiful move, they said it was Pelé, when I missed a pass or a shot, it was Coutinho". In 2007, in an interview on the TV show "Juca Entrevista" (ESPN), with the journalist Juca Kfouri, he revealed why he used the prop: "I had a small wrist injury and started wearing a band for a while of adhesive tape. But as soon as the pains ended, I took it off."

From 1958 to 1970, he wore the shirt of Santos, winning 19 titles and scoring 368 goals in 457 matches. In this period, he won alongside Santos FC five Taça Brasil and seven Campeonato Paulista titles, two Copa Libertadores, and two Intercontinental Cups.

Coutinho has been named the greatest Santos' player after Pelé, with whom he formed an effective attacking duo with 1461 goals scored (370 by Coutinho). Coutinho also holds a mark of respect against one of Santos' main rivals, Corinthians. In 12 years of classics he played, he never lost a game. In the year that the taboo was broken, in 1968, Coutinho no longer worked for Santos.

After his tenure at Santos, he also played for Vitória of Bahia, Portuguesa of São Paulo, and Atlas of Mexico.

International career

Coutinho made his first match for the Brazil national team in Uruguay, against the home team. He was 16 years old and was the starter in that match valid for the Atlantic Cup.

At the international level, Coutinho earned 15 caps and scored 6 goals with the Brazil national football team between 1960 and 1965. He was meant to be a starter in the 1962 FIFA World Cup squad, but he was sidelined by injury just before the tournament and did not appear, even though he remained in the squad. Brazil went on to win the title.

In his book, Coutinho, o Gênio da Área, Carlos Fernando Schinner states that João Saldanha tried to convince Coutinho to return to Brazil national football team few months prior to the 1970 FIFA World Cup in order to replace Tostão who was Brazil's main centre-forward at that time and had suffered a major injury putting in doubt his participation on that World Cup. Coutinho, who at that time was semi-retired and overweight, refused the invitation.

Death
Coutinho died on 11 March 2019 in Santos, São Paulo. His death was caused by a myocardial infarction due to diabetes and hypertension. Coutinho's health had been deteriorating in recent months, and in January he had been hospitalized for pneumonia.

Career Statistics

Honours

Club
Santos FC
Taça Brasil: 1961, 1962, 1963, 1964, 1965
Copa Libertadores: 1962, 1963
Intercontinental Cup: 1962, 1963
Campeonato Paulista: 1960, 1961, 1962, 1964, 1965, 1967
Torneio Rio–São Paulo: 1959, 1963, 1964, 1966
 Torneio de Paris: 1960, 1961
 Taça das Américas: 1963
 Torneio Pentagonal do México: 1959
 Taça Tereza Herrera (Espanha): 1959
 Torneio de Valência (Espanha): 1959
 Torneio Dr. Mario Echandi (Costa Rica): 1959
 Torneio Giallorosso (Itália): 1960
 Quadrangular de Lima (Peru): 1960
 Torneio Itália 1961 (Itália): 1961
 Torneio Internacional da Costa Rica (Costa Rica): 1961
 Pentagonal de Guadalajara (México): 1961
 Torneio Internacional da Venezuela (Venezuela): 1965
 Hexagonal do Chile (Chile): 1965
 Torneio de Nova York (Estados Unidos): 1966

International
Brazil
FIFA World Cup: 1962
Taça do Atlântico: 1960
Copa Roca: 1963
Copa Bernardo O'Higgins: 1961
Taça Oswaldo Cruz: 1961, 1962

Individual
Copa Libertadores Top Scorer: 1962
 1961 Taça Oswaldo Cruz (3 goals)
 1961 Torneio Rio–São Paulo Top Scorer (9 goals)
 1962 Campeonato Brasileiro Top Scorer (7 goals)
 1964 Torneio Rio–São Paulo Top Scorer (11 goals)

Notes

References

External links

 

1943 births
2019 deaths
People from Piracicaba
Brazilian footballers
Brazilian football managers
Afro-Brazilian sportspeople
Brazil international footballers
1962 FIFA World Cup players
 Copa Libertadores-winning players
FIFA World Cup-winning players
Expatriate footballers in Mexico
Santos FC players
Esporte Clube Vitória players
Associação Portuguesa de Desportos players
Atlas F.C. footballers
Bangu Atlético Clube players
Campeonato Brasileiro Série A players
Liga MX players
Brazilian expatriate footballers
Santos FC managers
Valeriodoce Esporte Clube managers
Comercial Futebol Clube (Ribeirão Preto) managers
Esporte Clube Santo André managers
Associação Desportiva São Caetano managers
Bonsucesso Futebol Clube managers
Association football forwards
Saad Esporte Clube players
Deaths from diabetes
Deaths from hypertension
Footballers from São Paulo (state)